The Merritt House is a historic house at 139 North Broadview in Greenbrier, Arkansas.  It is a single story wood-frame structure, finished with a masonry veneer, with an irregular plan featuring a variety of roof gables.  The exterior is finished in sandstone with cream-colored brick trim.  The main entrance is set under a deep front porch, whose front has a broad flat-topped arch, with a gable above that has a louver framed in brick.  The house was built by Silas Owen, Sr., a local master mason, in 1948 for Billy Merritt.  It was built using in part stone from a house built by Owen for Merritt's father, which had recently been torn down.

The house was listed on the National Register of Historic Places in 2005.

See also
National Register of Historic Places listings in Faulkner County, Arkansas

References

Houses on the National Register of Historic Places in Arkansas
Houses completed in 1948
Houses in Faulkner County, Arkansas
National Register of Historic Places in Faulkner County, Arkansas